Heimgarten (elevation ) is a mountain near Ohlstadt in the Bavarian Prealps of southern Germany. It is connected via a ridge with Herzogstand  to the east.

References

Mountains of the Alps
Mountains of Bavaria
Bavarian Prealps